Senator Robinson may refer to:

Members of the United States Senate
Arthur Raymond Robinson (1881–1961), U.S. Senator from Indiana from 1925 to 1935
John McCracken Robinson (1794–1843), U.S. Senator from Illinois from 1830 to 1841
Jonathan Robinson (American politician) (1756–1819), U.S. Senator from Vermont from 1807 to 1815
Joseph Taylor Robinson (1872–1937), U.S. Senator from Arkansas from 1913 to 1937
Moses Robinson (1741–1813), U.S. Senator from Vermont from 1791 to 1796

United States state senate members
Albert Robinson (Kentucky politician) (born 1938), Kentucky State Senate
Charles L. Robinson (1818–1894), Kansas State Senate
Dan Robinson (politician) (born 1926), North Carolina Senate
Devlin Robinson (born unknown), Pennsylvania State Senate
Edward Robinson (Maine politician) (1796–1857), Maine State Senate
Frederick Robinson (Massachusetts politician) (1799–1882), Massachusetts State Senate
George D. Robinson (1834–1896), Massachusetts State Senate
Gladys A. Robinson (born 1949), North Carolina State Senate
Helen Ring Robinson (1878–1923), Colorado State Senate
Ira E. Robinson (1869–1951), West Virginia State Senate
J. Kenneth Robinson (1916–1990), Virginia State Senate
James Fisher Robinson (1800–1882), Kentucky State Senate
John Buchanan Robinson (1846–1933), Pennsylvania State Senate
John S. Robinson (governor) (1804–1860), Vermont State Senate
John Robinson (Virginia politician, born 1822) (1822–1900), Virginia State Senate
Katrina Robinson (born 1981), Tennessee State Senate
Larry Robinson (politician) (born 1949), North Dakota State Senate
Lee Robinson (politician) (1943–2015), Georgia State Senate
Michael Waller Robinson (1837–1912), Illinois State Senate
Milton S. Robinson (1832–1892), Indiana State Senate
Orrin W. Robinson (1834–1907), Michigan State Senate
Rix Robinson (1792–1875), Michigan State Senate
Robert P. Robinson (Wisconsin politician) (1884–1953), Wisconsin State Senate
Shannon Robinson (born 1948), New Mexico State Senate
Theodore Douglas Robinson (1883–1934), New York State Senate
Thomas J. B. Robinson (1868–1958), Iowa State Senate